Kennedy et moi is a French film directed by Sam Karmann released on 22 December 1999. It is a comedy drama about an apathetic writer whose only interest is in his psychiatrist's watch which may have belonged to John F. Kennedy at the time of his assassination in 1963.

Cast
 Jean-Pierre Bacri: Simon Polaris
 Nicole Garcia: Anna Polaris
 Patrick Chesnais: Paul Gurney
 Sam Karmann: Robert Janssen
 François Chattot: Victor Kuriakhine
 Éléonore Gosset: Alice Polaris
 Lucas Bonnifait: Thomas Polaris
 Stephan Höhn: Thibaut Brentano
 Bruno Raffaelli: Doctor Munthe
 Francine Bergé: Lydia Brentano
 Jean-Claude Brialy: Benny Grimaldi
 Bernard Blancan (Scenes deleted)

References

External links

1999 films
1999 comedy-drama films
French comedy-drama films
1990s French films